The Broatch Building is located at 1209 Harney Street in Downtown Omaha, Nebraska. Built in 1880 with an 1887 expansion, it was designated an Omaha Landmark on December 20, 1983, and is a contributing building to the Old Market Historic District, which was listed on the National Register of Historic Places in 1981.

About
Built by an early Omaha entrepreneur, politician and civic leader named William James Broatch, the building became home to Omaha's first wholesale heavy hardware business in 1874. He also served twice as the mayor of Omaha.

Designed as a three-story building by Mendelssohn, Fisher and Lawrie and built in 1880, the building added a fourth story in 1887. In 1979 the building was completely renovated for the office of Bahr, Vermeer and Haecker, architects.

In early 2007 a local developer announced plans to renovate the Broatch and a neighboring building into condominiums. The development, called Erin Place, will feature a dozen condos.

References

External links
 Broatch Building, including modern photos

Commercial buildings completed in 1880
Omaha Landmarks
History of Downtown Omaha, Nebraska
1880 establishments in Nebraska
National Register of Historic Places in Omaha, Nebraska
Historic district contributing properties in Nebraska
Commercial buildings on the National Register of Historic Places in Nebraska